Chisocheton cumingianus subsp. balansae is a subspecies of Chisocheton cumingianus. It is a tree in the Meliaceae family. The tree is named for the French botanist Benjamin Balansa. The habitat is tropical forests: C.  cumingianus subsp. balansae is found in mainland Asia.

References

cumingianus subsp. balansae
Plants described in 1894
Trees of Asia
Plant subspecies